In discrete mathematics, the Bregman–Minc inequality, or Bregman's theorem, allows one to estimate the permanent of a binary matrix via its row or column sums. The inequality was conjectured in 1963 by Henryk Minc and first proved in 1973 by Lev M. Bregman. Further entropy-based proofs have been given by Alexander Schrijver and Jaikumar Radhakrishnan. The Bregman–Minc inequality is used, for example, in graph theory to obtain upper bounds for the number of perfect matchings in a bipartite graph.

Statement 

The permanent of a square binary matrix  of size  with row sums  for  can be estimated by

Equality holds if the matrix is a block diagonal matrix consisting of matrices of ones or results from row and/or column permutations of such a block diagonal matrix. Since the permanent is invariant under transposition, the inequality also holds for the column sums of the matrix accordingly.

Application 

This way, each nonzero entry of the matrix  defines an edge in the graph  and vice versa. Each nonzero summand of the permanent of  satisfying

holds. The Bregman–Minc inequality now yields the estimate

where  is the degree of the vertex . The number of possible perfect matchings in a bipartite graph with equal-sized partitions can therefore be estimated via the degrees of the vertices of any of the two partitions.

Related statements 

Using the inequality of arithmetic and geometric means, the Bregman–Minc inequality directly implies the weaker estimate

which was proven by Henryk Minc already in 1963. Another direct consequence of the Bregman–Minc inequality is a proof of the following conjecture of Herbert Ryser from 1960.

The maximum is thereby attained for a block diagonal matrix whose diagonal blocks are square matrices of ones of size .

See also 
 Computing the permanent

References

External links 
 

Theorems in discrete mathematics